Qoli Kandi (also Romanized as Qolī Kandī) is a village in Gonbad Rural District, in the Central District of Hamadan County, Hamadan Province, Iran. At the 2006 census, its population was 90, in 17 families.

References 

Populated places in Hamadan County